The 1988–89 Allsvenskan was the 55th season of the top division of Swedish handball. 12 teams competed in the league. HK Drott won the regular season but Redbergslids IK won the playoffs and claimed their 12th Swedish title. GF Kroppskultur, IFK Malmö and IFK Karlskrona were relegated.

League table

Playoffs

Semifinals 
 LUGI–HK Drott 22–19, 28–30 (p), 17–18  (HK Drott won series 2–1)
 IK Sävehof–Redbergslids IK 13–20, 16–28 (Redbergslids IK won series 2–0)

Finals 
 Redbergslids IK–HK Drott 28–24, 22–17, 22–20 (Redbergslids IK won series 3–0)

References 

Swedish handball competitions